Octavio Ernesto Pozo Miranda (born 31 July 1983) is a Chilean footballer. His current club is Colchagua.

Career
In 2006–07, Pozo had a stint with Persiku Kudus, where he coincided with his compatriot Christian González.

Honours

Player
Palestino
 Primera División de Chile (1): Runner-up 2008 Clausura

Huachipato
 Primera División de Chile (1): 2012

References

External links
 Profile at BDFA 
 

1983 births
Living people
Footballers from Santiago
Chilean footballers
Chilean expatriate footballers
Audax Italiano footballers
Persiku Kudus players
Club Deportivo Palestino footballers
Naval de Talcahuano footballers
Deportes Melipilla footballers
Unión La Calera footballers
C.D. Huachipato footballers
Ñublense footballers
San Marcos de Arica footballers
Puerto Montt footballers
Deportes Colchagua footballers
Chilean Primera División players
Indonesian Premier Division players
Primera B de Chile players
Segunda División Profesional de Chile players
Expatriate footballers in Indonesia
Chilean expatriate sportspeople in Indonesia
Association football midfielders